Lynda Jane Voltz (born 1965) is an Australian politician and Labor Party member of the New South Wales Legislative Assembly, representing Auburn since 2019. Voltz was previously a member of the New South Wales Legislative Council from 2007 to 2019. As of April 2016, Voltz is also the Shadow Minister for Sport and Veterans' Affairs.

Voltz was born in Hornsby on Sydney's North Shore, and attended Birrong Girls High School.

Voltz joined the Australian Army Reserve in 1984, and in 1987 she became one of the first women to the join the regular Australian Army as one of the second group of women to train alongside men at Army Recruit Training Centre at Kapooka. She joined the Royal Australian Corps of Military Police, as it was one of the few field force units women were allowed to join.

After leaving the army, she worked as a political staffer for state MP Sandra Nori, federal member for Sydney Peter Baldwin, and then as an electoral officer for Senator John Faulkner. At the 1995 New South Wales state election, she contested the district of North Shore but was defeated by the Liberal candidate, Jillian Skinner.

She has two daughters, Katerina and Anastasia.

References

External links 

 Lynda Voltz - New South Wales Labour

1965 births
Living people
Members of the New South Wales Legislative Assembly
Members of the New South Wales Legislative Council
Politicians from Sydney
Australian Army soldiers
Australian Labor Party members of the Parliament of New South Wales
Labor Left politicians
21st-century Australian politicians
21st-century Australian women politicians
Women members of the New South Wales Legislative Assembly
Women members of the New South Wales Legislative Council